The Colorful Daegu Championships Meeting was an annual track and field competition at the Daegu Stadium in Daegu, South Korea as part of the IAAF World Challenge Meetings. The first edition took place in 2005 under the name Colorful Daegu Pre-Championship Meeting. The event was last organized in 2012.

Meet records

Men

Women

References

External links
 Colorful Daegu Championships Meeting web site

Annual track and field meetings
IAAF World Challenge
Recurring sporting events established in 2005
Athletics in South Korea
Sports competitions in Daegu